Giampaolo Messina (born 10 September 1957) is an Italian marathon runner. He competed in the 1983 World Championships in Athletics.

Personal best
Marathon: 2:12:42 -  Chicago, 26 September 1982

Achievements

National titles
He won two national championships at senior level.
Half marathon: 1979
Marathon: 1981

See also
 Italy at the 1982 European Athletics Championships

References

External links
 

1957 births
Living people
World Athletics Championships athletes for Italy
Italian male long-distance runners
Italian male marathon runners
Sportspeople from Bari